The 1967 All-Pacific-8 Conference football team consists of American football players chosen by the Associated Press (AP), the United Press International (UPI), and the Pacific-8 Conference (Pac-8) coaches (Coaches) as the best college football players by position in the Pac-8 during the 1967 NCAA University Division football season.

The 1967 USC Trojans football team won the national championship and placed seven players on the first team: running back O. J. Simpson; end Earl McCullouch; offensive tackle Ron Yary; offensive guard Mike Scarpace; defensive end Tim Rossovich; linebacker Adrian Young; and defensive back Mike Battle.

Offensive selections

Quarterbacks
 Gary Beban, UCLA (AP-1 [back]; UPI-1 [back]; Coaches-1 [quarterback])
 Steve Preece, Oregon State (UPI-2 [back]; Coaches-2 [quarterback])

Backs
 Bill Enyart, Oregon State (AP-1; UPI-1; Coaches-1)
 O. J. Simpson, USC (AP-1; UPI-1; Coaches-1)
 Gene Washington, Stanford (AP-1; UPI-1; Coaches-1)
 Rick Purdy, UCLA (UPI-2; Coaches-2)
 Greg Jones, UCLA (UPI-2)
 Jim Lawrence, USC (UPI-2)
 Bill Main, Oregon State (Coaches-2)
 Claxton Welch, Oregon (Coaches-2)

Ends
 Earl McCullouch, USC (AP-1; UPI-1; Coaches-1)
 Wayne Stewart, California (AP-1; UPI-2; Coaches-2)
 George Buehler, Stanford (UPI-1)
 Gary Houser, Oregon State (Coaches-1)
 Dave Nuttall, UCLA (AP-2; UPI-2)
 Doug Flansburg, Washington State (AP-2)
 Bob Klein, USC (Coaches-2)

Tackles
 Larry Slagle, UCLA (AP-1; UPI-1; Coaches-1)
 Ron Yary, USC (AP-1; UPI-1; Coaches-1)
 Bob Richardson, Washington (AP-2; Coaches-2)
 Roger Stalick, Oregon State (AP-2)
 Mal Snider, Stanford (UPI-2; Coaches-1)
 Mike Taylor, USC (UPI-2)

Guards
 Dave Marlette, Oregon State (AP-1; UPI-2; Coaches-1)
 Mike Scarpace, USC (AP-1; UPI-1; Coaches-2)
 Dennis Murphy, UCLA (AP-2; Coaches-1)
 Dave Middendorf, Washington State (UPI-1; Coaches-2)
 Bob Heffernan, Stanford (AP-2)
 Ken Bajema, UCLA (UPI-2)

Centers
 John Erquiaga, UCLA (AP-2; UPI-1; Coaches-1)
 John Didion, Oregon State (AP-1; UPI-2; Coaches-2)

Defensive selections

Defensive ends
 Tim Rossovich, USC (AP-1; UPI-1; Coaches-1)
 Dean Halverson, Washington (AP-1; UPI-1; Coaches-2)
 Mike McCaffrey, California (Coaches-1)
 Jimmy Gunn, USC (UPI-2; Coaches-2)
 Tom Hazelrigg, Stanford (AP-2)
 Harry Gunner, Oregon State (AP-2)
 Cam Molter, Oregon (UPI-2)

Defensive tackles
 Steve Thompson, Washington (AP-1; UPI-1; Coaches-1)
 Jess Lewis, Oregon State (AP-1; UPI-2; Coaches-2)
 Blaine Nye, Stanford (AP-2; Coaches-1)
 Ron Boley, Oregon State (AP-2; UPI-1)
 Al Claman, UCLA (UPI-2; Coaches-2)

Guard
 George Dames, Oregon (AP-1 [guard]; UPI-1 [linebacker]; Coaches-1 [guard])
 Jon Sandstrom, Oregon State (AP-2 [guard]; UPI-2 [linebacker])
 Mike Maggart, Washington (Coaches-2)

Linebackers
 Don Manning, UCLA (AP-1; UPI-1; Coaches-1)
 Adrian Young, USC (AP-1; UPI-1; Coaches-1)
 Martin Brill, Stanford (AP-2; UPI-2; Coaches-1)
 Skip Vanderbundt, Oregon State (AP-1; UPI-2; Coaches-2)
 Jim Snow, USC (AP-2; Coaches-2)
 George Jugum, Washington (AP-2)
 Jim Featherstone, California (Coaches-2)

Defensive backs
 Jim Smith, Oregon (AP-1; UPI-1; Coaches-1)
 Mark Gustafson, UCLA (AP-2; UPI-1; Coaches-1)
 Mike Battle, USC (AP-1; UPI-1)
 Bobby Smith, California (AP-1; UPI-2; Coaches-2)
 Mark Waletich, Oregon State (AP-2; UPI-2)
 Ken Wiedemann, California (AP-2; UPI-1)
 Bob Pederson, Washington (UPI-2)
 Dan Sprlesterbach, Washington (UPI-2)
 Pat Cashman, USC (Coaches-2)
 Andy Herrera, UCLA (Coaches-2)

Special teams

Kicker
 Zenon Andrusyshyn, UCLA (UPI-1)

Key
AP = Associated Press

UPI = United Press International

Coaches = chosen by the Pac-8 head coaches

See also
1967 College Football All-America Team

References

All-Pacific-8 Conference Football Team
All-Pac-12 Conference football teams